Kõpu is a village in Tõstamaa Parish, Pärnu County, in southwestern Estonia. It has a population of 11 (as of 1 January 2011).

In 1873 the Pootsi-Kõpu Holy Trinity Apostolic Orthodox church was built.

The eastern half of the village is covered by Lindi Nature Reserve with Lindi bog.

Pootsi-Kõpu church

References

Villages in Pärnu County
Kreis Pernau